Wrapper generally refers to a type of packaging. It may also refer to:

Computing
 Wrapper (data mining), a technique used in data mining
 Wrapper function, a function whose main purpose is to call a second function
 Wrapper library
 Driver wrapper, software that functions as an adapter between an operating system and a driver
 Wrapper pattern, where some computer programming code allows certain classes to work together that otherwise would not
 Primitive wrapper class, a computer term referring to a Java class in object-oriented programming
 TCP Wrapper, software used for filtering network access.
 Service wrapper, software that enables other programs to be run as services or daemons
 A digital container format containing both data and metadata

Other
 Wrapper (clothing), a woman's garment which is worn over nightwear in North America, and a colorful women's garment widely worn in West Africa
 Wrapper (philately), postal stationery which pays the delivery cost of a newspaper or a periodical
 Wrapper, the outer leaf of tobacco used in cigar making
 Newspaper wrapper
 The dust jacket of a hardcover book

See also
 
 
 Label (disambiguation)
 Wrap (disambiguation)
 Rapping